Xinjiang Mandarin is an umbrella term to geographically group three different varieties of Mandarin Chinese spoken in Xinjiang. Lanyin Mandarin is spoken in northern Xinjiang. Central Plains Mandarin (中原官话) is spoken in southern Xinjiang,. Beijing Mandarin is spoken in the most northern frontier Xinjiang by the Xinjiang Production and Construction Corps settled there since the 1950s.

Due to language contact between the Uyghurs and Han Chinese, Xinjiang Mandarin received some elements from the Uyghur language.

References

Citations

Works cited

 

Xinjiang
Mandarin Chinese
Dialects by location